Rubus philadelphicus is an uncommon North American species of brambles in the rose family. It has been found in the eastern United States, primarily in the Appalachian Mountains of Pennsylvania and West Virginia.

Rubus philadelphicus is an prickly shrub with arching canes, slightly prickly. Fruit is fleshy and by all accounts good-tasting.

The genetics of Rubus is extremely complex, so that it is difficult to decide on which groups should be recognized as species. There are many rare species with limited ranges such as this. Further study is suggested to clarify the taxonomy.

References

External links
 

philadelphicus
Plants described in 1907
Flora of the Eastern United States